Morteza Mahjoob (born March 20, 1980) is an Iranian chess grandmaster. He won Iranian Chess Championship in 2005 and 2008.

In 2005 his rating was 2442 and in 2016 his rating was 2354. In 2007 he became grandmaster.

In September 2005 he won Iranian Chess Championship with the score 9.5 points out of 11.

Mahjoob previously held the world record for simultaneous exhibition, which he set on August 13, 2009. He walked 18 hours and won 397 of the games, 90 draws and 13 loses. His record was broken on October 21, 2010 by GM Alik Gershon.

External links

References  

1980 births
Chess grandmasters
Iranian chess players
Living people
Chess players at the 2010 Asian Games
Asian Games competitors for Iran